Malaysia participated in the 2017 Southeast Asian Games from 14 to 30 August 2017 as the host nation of the 29th edition of the Games. The Malaysian contingent was represented by 844 athletes consisting of 469 men and 375 women.

The Malaysian contingent became overall Southeast Asian Games champion for only the second time ever in the history of the games amassing a total of 145 gold medals more than the targeted figure of 111 gold medals.

Competitors

Medal summary

Medal by sport

Medal by Date

Medalists

References

2017
Southeast Asian Games
Nations at the 2017 Southeast Asian Games